Stan Keery (9 September 1931 – 7 March 2013) was an English professional footballer who played as a wing half.

Career
Born in Derby, Keery played for Blackburn Rovers, Shrewsbury Town, Newcastle United, Mansfield Town and Crewe Alexandra, making a total of 341 appearances in the Football League. He died on 7 March 2013.

References

1931 births
2013 deaths
Footballers from Derby
English footballers
Blackburn Rovers F.C. players
Shrewsbury Town F.C. players
Newcastle United F.C. players
Mansfield Town F.C. players
Crewe Alexandra F.C. players
English Football League players
Association football wing halves